Tim Kubart (born July 25, 1984) is an American actor and musician.

Career
In 2016, Kubart won the Grammy Award for Best Children's Album for his album Home.
Kubart was the host of Sprout's Sunny Side Up, which in 2015 enjoyed a guest appearance from Michelle Obama. He is also known as the energetic Tambourine Guy, a long running cast member of Scott Bradlee's Postmodern Jukebox.

In May 2018, Kubart released a children's book titled Oopsie-Do, illustrated by Lori Richmond. In September 2018, he released the album Building Blocks.

Filmography

Film

Television

References

External links
 http://www.timkubart.com/
 

1984 births
Living people
Grammy Award winners
American male actors
American male musicians
Fordham University alumni